Shirley Anne Macnamara (born 1949) is an Australian Indigenous artist from the Indjilanji/Alyewarre language group of North West Queensland best known for her woven spinifex sculptures.

Early life and education 
Macnamara grew up on a cattle station near Camooweal, Queensland, where her family worked. She began her education at Camooweal State School. From 1989 she attended Australian Flying Arts School workshops in Queensland, working in watercolour. She also worked with mixed media, installation and sculpture before turning to weaving local spinifex to create organic forms.

Work
Using the abundant spinifex grass in her people's country in northwest Queensland her weavings reflect the environment, intertwining the landscape with her personal and ancestral stories.

Exhibitions, collections, awards

Solo exhibitions 
'Dyinala, Nganinya', Queensland Art Gallery (21 September 2019 – 1 March 2020)
'Layered Threads', University of Queensland Art Museum, Brisbane (18 August – 24 November 2018)
'Maardi Butala', Alcaston Gallery, Melbourne (14–25 March 2017)
'Race against time', Alcaston Gallery, Melbourne (14 October – 7 November 2014)

Group exhibitions 
15 Artists, Redcliffe Art Gallery, Moreton Bay Regional Council, Queensland, 2019
7th Asia Pacific Triennial of Contemporary Art at Queensland Art Gallery | Gallery of Modern Art (8 December 2012 – 14 April 2013).

Public collections 
 Campbelltown Arts Centre
 National Gallery of Australia, Canberra
 Perc Tucker Regional Gallery, Townsville
 Queensland Art Gallery | Gallery of Modern Art

Awards 
2017 Wandjuk Markira Memorial Three-Dimensional Award, 34th Telstra National Aboriginal and Torres Strait Islander Art Awards

References 

Australian artists
1949 births
Living people
20th-century Australian women artists
20th-century Australian artists
21st-century Australian women artists
21st-century Australian artists
Australian women sculptors